Ark Valley High Rollers (AVHR) is a women's flat track roller derby league based in Salida, Colorado. Founded in 2010, the league currently consists of two mixed teams which compete against teams from other leagues. Ark Valley is a member of the Women's Flat Track Derby Association (WFTDA).

The league started training together in March 2010, and played its first full bout in January 2011, losing to Pikes Peak Derby Dames' B team.

Ark Valley was accepted into the Women's Flat Track Derby Association Apprentice Program in April 2011, and became a full member of the WFTDA in December 2011.  It claims to be the WFTDA member with the smallest population base.

Rankings

 NR = no end-of-year ranking assigned

References

Chaffee County, Colorado
Roller derby leagues established in 2010
Roller derby leagues in Colorado
Women's Flat Track Derby Association Division 3
2010 establishments in Colorado